Luciano Ramón Palos (born 29 November 1979) is an Argentine former footballer who played as a goalkeeper. His last club was Gimnasia y Tiro.

Honours

Club
Newell's Old Boys
 Argentine Primera División (1): 2004 Apertura

San Luis Quillota
 Primera B (1): 2009 Clausura

Cobreloa
 Primera División de Chile (1): 2011 Clausura

External links
 Profile at BDFA
 

1979 births
Living people
Argentine footballers
Primera B de Chile players
Chilean Primera División players
Quilmes Atlético Club footballers
Newell's Old Boys footballers
Club Atlético Belgrano footballers
Gimnasia y Esgrima de Jujuy footballers
San Luis de Quillota footballers
Cobreloa footballers
Expatriate footballers in Chile
Expatriate footballers in Romania
Argentine people of Uruguayan descent
Sportspeople of Uruguayan descent
Association football goalkeepers
Footballers from Rosario, Santa Fe